Tommaso Biasci (born 10 November 1994) is an Italian professional footballer who plays as a forward for  club Catanzaro.

Club career
A youth product of Pisa and Livorno, Biasci made his professional debut with Livorno coming on as a late sub with Livorno in a 2–0 Serie B win over Vicenza on 27 April 2013. He started his early career on loan with Lucchese and Paganese in the Serie C. After his contract expired with Livorno, he moved to the Serie D in stints with Ponsacco and Massese, before returning to the Serie C with Carrarese. In the summer of 2019, he signed with Carpi, and scored 16 goals in 27 games in his debut season.

On 8 January 2021, he joined Padova on loan with an obligation to buy.

On 20 January 2022, he moved on loan to Catanzaro with an option to buy.

References

External links
 
 

1994 births
Living people
Sportspeople from the Province of Pisa
Italian footballers
Association football forwards
Serie B players
Serie C players
Serie D players
U.S. Livorno 1915 players
S.S.D. Lucchese 1905 players
Paganese Calcio 1926 players
F.C. Ponsacco 1920 S.S.D. players
U.S. Massese 1919 players
Carrarese Calcio players
A.C. Carpi players
Calcio Padova players
U.S. Catanzaro 1929 players
Footballers from Tuscany